Brown Cove is a small body of salt water that extends southward from Little Skookum Inlet. The Community of Kamilche, Washington is near by.

Geography of Mason County, Washington